The Bookman may refer to:

The Bookman (London), catalog of publications
The Bookman (New York), literary journal